Ceylon is a city in Martin County, Minnesota, United States. The population was 369 at the 2010 census.

History
Ceylon was platted in 1899. It was named after British Ceylon, which was then a British colony, known today as Sri Lanka. A post office has been in operation in Ceylon since 1899. The name Chanhassen was already in use, so a group of men sitting in Tom Sahr's general store suggested Ceylon for the boxes of Ceylon tea in the store.

Geography

Demographics

2010 census
As of the census of 2010, there were 369 people, 153 households, and 100 families living in the city. The racial makeup of the city was 97.0% White, 0.3% Native American, 1.6% from other races, and 1.1% from two or more races. Hispanic or Latino of any race were 4.9% of the population.

There were 153 households, of which 30.1% had children under the age of 18 living with them, 54.9% were married couples living together, 7.2% had a female householder with no husband present, 3.3% had a male householder with no wife present, and 34.6% were non-families. 27.5% of all households were made up of individuals, and 13% had someone living alone who was 65 years of age or older. The average household size was 2.41 and the average family size was 2.98.

The median age in the city was 42.1 years. 25.7% of residents were under the age of 18; 4.8% were between the ages of 18 and 24; 21.5% were from 25 to 44; 30.6% were from 45 to 64; and 17.3% were 65 years of age or older. The gender makeup of the city was 52.3% male and 47.7% female.

2000 census
As of the census of 2000, there were 413 people, 175 households, and 121 families living in the city. The racial makeup of the city was 98.55% White, 0.24% Pacific Islander, and 1.21% from two or more races. Hispanic or Latino of any race were 2.18% of the population.

There were 175 households, out of which 28.0% had children under the age of 18 living with them, 59.4% were married couples living together, 6.3% had a female householder with no husband present, and 30.3% were non-families. 24.6% of all households were made up of individuals, and 11.4% had someone living alone who was 65 years of age or older. The average household size was 2.36 and the average family size was 2.80.

In the city, the population was spread out, with 24.2% under the age of 18, 7.3% from 18 to 24, 22.5% from 25 to 44, 24.7% from 45 to 64, and 21.3% who were 65 years of age or older. The median age was 41 years. For every 100 females, there were 105.5 males. For every 100 females age 18 and over, there were 101.9 males.

The median income for a household in the city was $31,100, and the median income for a family was $32,708. Males had a median income of $23,889 versus $23,125 for females. The per capita income for the city was $15,607. About 9.6% of families and 17.6% of the population were below the poverty line, including 42.9% of those under age 18 and 13.3% of those age 65 or over.

Notable people
Walter Mondale (1928–2021), Vice President of the United States, United States Senator, Minnesota Attorney General, and presidential nominee was born in Ceylon.
Bob Waltman (1933–2010), Minnesota state legislator, was born in Ceylon.

References

Cities in Minnesota
Cities in Martin County, Minnesota
Populated places established in 1899
1899 establishments in Minnesota